Saboteur is a 1942 American spy thriller film directed by Alfred Hitchcock with a screenplay written by Peter Viertel, Joan Harrison and Dorothy Parker. The film stars Robert Cummings, Priscilla Lane and Norman Lloyd.

Plot
Barry Kane is falsely accused of torching Stewart Aircraft Works in Glendale, California, an act of sabotage that incinerates one of his co-workers. Barry believes the real culprit is a man named Fry, but investigators find no such name on the employee list. Thus Barry becomes the target of a manhunt. While eluding capture, he remembers Fry's address from an envelope, so he thumbs a truck ride to a huge ranch in the High Desert. While there, he learns the whereabouts of Fry and that the ranch's owner, Charles Tobin, is collaborating with Fry and other saboteurs. Barry escapes the ranch, later taking refuge with a blind man whose niece, Patricia Martin, attempts to betray him to police. Barry insists he is innocent and kidnaps Patricia. This leads to a series of adventures that take the couple from one end of the country to the other.

Barry and Patricia stow away on a circus caravan, whose members conceal the pair from authorities. Eventually the two reach Soda City, a desert ghost town, where they separate. After infiltrating Tobin's spy ring, Barry learns the saboteurs are preparing to disable a new battleship at the Brooklyn Navy Yard. Meanwhile, Patricia contacts the nearest sheriff, who she later discovers is on Tobin's payroll. Tobin and associates retrieve Patricia from the sheriff and take her to New York. At the same time, Barry and the saboteurs travel to New York and meet with Tobin and the captive Patricia at the posh home of a rich sympathizer, Mrs. Sutton. Later, Tobin's organization imprisons Patricia in an office high up Rockefeller Center, while Barry is locked in the Sutton basement. He escapes by triggering a fire alarm. At the same time, from the multi-storied office building, Patricia floats an SOS note out a window. It lands next to a group of cab drivers who read it and notify police.

Barry rushes to the Navy Yard and locates Fry at the controls of a device designed to blow up the battleship. In the ensuing struggle, Fry successfully presses the button that sends the ship to the bottom of the harbor. Fry then escapes. After terrorizing a movie audience at Radio City Music Hall, he takes the ferry to Bedloe's Island and hides inside the Statue of Liberty, where he is later discovered and confronted by both Barry and Patricia. Barry pursues Fry onto Lady Liberty's torch, holding him at gunpoint. While backing away from Barry, however, Fry falls over the platform's railing and clings to the statue's hand. Barry tries to save him, but as the police and FBI arrive, Fry falls to his death.

Cast

 Robert Cummings as Barry Kane
 Priscilla Lane as Patricia "Pat" Martin
 Otto Kruger as Charles Tobin
 Alan Baxter as Freeman
 Clem Bevans as Neilson
 Norman Lloyd as Frank Fry
 Alma Kruger as Mrs. Sutton
 Vaughan Glaser as Uncle Phillip Martin (as Vaughan Glazer)
 Dorothy Peterson as Mrs. Mason
 Ian Wolfe as Robert
 Frances Carson as Society Woman
 Murray Alper as Truck Driver
 Kathryn Adams as Mrs. Brown (Tobin's daughter)
 Pedro de Cordoba as Bones - Circus Troupe
 Billy Curtis as Major / Midget - Circus Troupe 
 Marie LeDeaux as Titania the Fat Woman - Circus Troupe (as Matie Ke Deaux)
 Anita Sharp-Bolster as Esmeralda - Circus Troupe (as Anita Bloster)
 Jean Romer as Siamese Twins (as Jeanne Romer)
 Laura Mason as Siamese Twins (as Lynn Romer)

Production

Development
Hitchcock was under contract to David O. Selznick, so he first pitched the idea for the film to him; Selznick gave the okay for a script to be written, assigning John Houseman to keep an eye on its progress and direction. Val Lewton, Selznick's story editor, eventually rejected the script, which reviewer Leonard Maltin later called "extremely offbeat," so Selznick forced Hitchcock to offer it to other studios, "causing ill feelings between the producer and his director since it not only showed a lack of belief in Hitchcock's abilities, but also because the terms of Hitchcock's contract would net Selznick a three-hundred percent profit on the sale."

Universal signed on, but Hitchcock could not have the two actors he wanted for the leading roles. Gary Cooper was uninterested in the project and Barbara Stanwyck had other commitments. He settled on Robert Cummings who had a new contract with Universal, while Priscilla Lane was borrowed from Warner Bros. although her scenes had to wait while she finished Arsenic and Old Lace, a production that was eventually shelved until its 1944 release.

In November 1941, Universal announced that Hitchcock would make the film for the studio, and it would be produced by Frank Lloyd and Jack Skirball. Cummings and Lane were to star. Hitchcock later said he was "lucky" to have "young players who are intelligent and sensitive to direction" and "players who are unmistakeably young American. It was easy to bring out the familiar qualities to make Bob seem the loveable boy at the next lathe or around the corner. In Priscilla too I had the resolute and daring attributes typical of American girlhood. I wanted the boy and girl in Saboteur to suggest the thrilling importance of unimportant people, to forget they were movie stars, to remember only that they were free and in terrible danger."

Universal did bring in Dorothy Parker to write a few scenes, "mostly the patriotic speeches given by the hero." Although Parker had been brought in to "punch up the dialogue", Hitchcock also called in Peter Viertel to continue to work on the script.

Hitchcock described the film as a series of "cameos" like The 39 Steps. It was originally meant to finish with a climax at the movie theatre which was showing Abbott and Costello's film Ride 'Em Cowboy. According to The New York Times "the studio feels that the booking will materially enhance the prestige of the comedians." However, that film was not used in the final movie.

Shooting
Filming took place from December 1941 to February 1942.

Hitchcock used extensive location footage in the film, which was unusual for Hollywood productions at the time. Second unit director Vernon Keays and cinematographer Charles Van Enger shot exteriors in the Alabama Hills of Lone Pine, California, and John P. Fulton shot the background footage in New York City. For the New York City footage, special long lenses were used to shoot from great distances. One background shot shows a capsized ship in the harbor. Fry glances at it and smiles knowingly. The ship shown is the former SS Normandie, which burned and sank in February 1942, leading to rumors of German sabotage.

There was clever matching of the location footage with studio shots, many using matte paintings for background, for example in shots of the western ghost town, "Soda City". The famed Statue of Liberty sequence takes place on the torch platform, which had actually been closed to public access since the Black Tom sabotage in 1916. A mock-up built for filming accurately depicted this part of the statue. The scene also used innovative visual effects. In particular, Lloyd lay on his side on a black saddle on a black floor while the camera was moved from close-up to 40 feet above him, making him appear to drop downward, away from the camera. Film taken from the top of the Statue was then superimposed onto the black background.

There was no music score for the film's Radio City sequence; instead, Hitchcock combined action shown on the theater screen (including gunshots) with the action in the theater. The contrast of the large screen images with the shootout below encompassed the audience into the action and was one of the more effective scenes in Saboteur.

Hitchcock makes his trademark cameo appearance about an hour into the film (1:04:37), standing at a kiosk in front of Cut Rate Drugs in New York as the saboteurs' car pulls up. In his book-length interview with François Truffaut (Simon & Schuster, 1967), Hitchcock says he and Parker filmed a cameo showing them as the elderly couple who see Cummings and Lane hitchhiking and drive away, but that he decided to change that shot to the existing cameo.

Scripting, pre-production, and principal photography on Saboteur wrapped in 15 weeks, the fastest Hitchcock had ever worked. By January 1942, the film was in post-production. Early in April, Saboteur was "redflagged" by officials in the War Office who had concerns about the scene involving the SS Normandie. Regarding this scene, Hitchcock said: "the Navy raised hell with Universal about these shots because I implied that the Normandie had been sabotaged, which was a reflection on their lack of vigilance in guarding it." Despite the official objections, the scene remained in the final film. Saboteur was premiered in Washington, D.C. on April 22, 1942, with Hitchcock, Cummings and Lane, along with 80 U.S. Senators and 350 U.S. Congressmen, in attendance.

Use of irony and symbolism
Hitchcock made use of irony on numerous occasions in Saboteur. For example, early in the film, the authorities are seen as menacing, while the well-respected rancher and kind grandfather is an enemy agent. In contrast, only ordinary folks and the down-on-their-luck perceive Kane's innocence and offer trust: a long-haul truck driver, a blind householder and the circus freaks. In New York City, wealthy Mrs. Sutton is secretly funding an enemy group.

Saboteur is an early example of the distrust of authority that is one of Hitchcock's hallmarks. The plot structure of the film, with the falsely accused man having to go undercover and track down the real crooks/spies whilst criss-crossing the USA, and the final fight high up on an iconic American monument (and with the hero assisted here by his lady), clearly prefigure North by Northwest, filmed almost twenty years later. These parallels are openly discussed in Truffaut's famous book of interviews with him, Hitchcock/Truffaut, in the pages dealing with the earlier film, and when Truffaut notes that North by Northwest was a kind of remake of the older film, Hitchock confirms: "Yes".

Driving along the New York waterfront, Kane's car passes by the capsized hulk of the liner SS Normandie, an ominous warning of what could happen if the conspirators succeed in their plans.

The final battle symbolizing tyranny against democracy takes place on the torch of the Statue of Liberty.

Reception
Saboteur did "very well at the box office even with its B-list cast"; it made a "tidy profit for all involved." Bosley Crowther of The New York Times called the film a "swift, high-tension film which throws itself forward so rapidly that it permits slight opportunity for looking back. And it hurtles the holes and bumps which plague it with a speed that forcefully tries to cover them up." Crowther commented that "so abundant [are] the breathless events that one might forget, in the hubbub, that there is no logic in this wild-goose chase"; he also questioned the "casual presentation of the FBI as a bunch of bungling dolts, [the film's] general disregard of authorized agents, and [its] slur on the navy yard police", all of which "somewhat vitiates the patriotic implications which they have tried to emphasize in the film."

Time magazine called Saboteur "one hour and 45 minutes of almost simon-pure melodrama from the hand of the master"; the film's "artful touches serve another purpose which is only incidental to Saboteurs melodramatic intent. They warn Americans, as Hollywood has so far failed to do, that fifth columnists can be outwardly clean and patriotic citizens, just like themselves."

Norman Lloyd recalls that Ben Hecht told Hitchcock after seeing the death of a character in the finale, "He should have had a better tailor."

Legacy
Critic Rob Nixon, writing for Turner Classic Movies, points out that Saboteur shares several essential elements with Hitchcock's later movie North by Northwest (1959), including the ordinary/every-man protagonist who gets accused of a terrible crime and must avoid being captured by the police as he attempts to solve the mystery and clear his name (which is a recurring theme in Hitchcock's movies), and, the climactic scene in which the protagonist attempts to save another character from falling off a huge national monument.

References

Notes

Citations

Bibliography

External links

 
 
 
 
 

1942 films
1940s spy thriller films
American aviation films
American spy thriller films
American black-and-white films
American chase films
Films directed by Alfred Hitchcock
Films set in California
Films set in New York City
Films set on the home front during World War II
Films shot in Lone Pine, California
Films with screenplays by Dorothy Parker
Universal Pictures films
World War II spy films
Films scored by Frank Skinner
1940s English-language films
Statue of Liberty in fiction
1940s American films